The Ghost is a tour-only album by Songs: Ohia. It was recorded by Jason Molina on a boombox at his home in Chicago, Illinois, United States, and released by Secretly Canadian on March 1, 1999. It was released as a limited edition of 500 copies, and made available on Songs: Ohia's 1999 tour with Drunk.

Track listing
All songs written by Jason Molina.
"The Dark Wrong Turn"
"Ruby Eyes in the Fog"
"At Certain Hours It All Breaks Down"
"The Wild Wind"
"The Lost Messenger"
"One Harrowing Night"
"You Are Not Alone on the Road"
"Why Are We Stopping in the Storm"
"The Far End of the Bridge"
"A Widow Sang the Stars Down"

Recording information
 Jason Molina

External links
 Secretly Canadian press release

1999 albums
Jason Molina albums
Secretly Canadian albums